A cholecystocyte is an epithelial cell found in the gallbladder.

See also 
 List of human cell types derived from the germ layers

References 

Epithelial cells
Hepatology
Human cells
Gallbladder